|}

The Irish Champion Hurdle is a Grade 1 National Hunt hurdle race in Ireland which is open to horses aged four years or older. It is run at Leopardstown over a distance of about 2 miles (3,219 metres), and during its running there are eight hurdles to be jumped. The race is scheduled to take place each year in late January or early February.

The event was established in 1950, and it is now one of two Irish races, along with the Punchestown Champion Hurdle, which can be seen as equivalents of the Champion Hurdle in England. The most recent winner of the Leopardstown version to win the Champion Hurdle in the same season was Honeysuckle in 2022. The Irish Champion Hurdle was sponsored by AIG Europe from 1993 to 2008, by Toshiba in 2009 and 2010 and by BHP Insurance from 2011 to 2019. The race has been sponsored by PCI since 2020 and is now part of the Dublin Racing Festival weekend.

Records
Most successful horse (5 wins):
 Hurricane Fly – 2011, 2012, 2013, 2014, 2015
Most successful jockey (6 wins):
 Charlie Swan – Nordic Surprise (1991), Istabraq (1998, 1999, 2000, 2001), Like-A-Butterfly (2003)
 Ruby Walsh – Brave Inca (2009), Hurricane Fly (2012, 2013, 2014, 2015), Faugheen (2016)
Most successful trainer (7 wins): 
 Willie Mullins – Hurricane Fly (2011, 2012, 2013, 2014, 2015), Faugheen (2016), State Man (2023)

Winners

See also
 Horse racing in Ireland
 List of Irish National Hunt races

References
 Racing Post:

 pedigreequery.com – Leopardstown Champion Hurdle – Leopardstown.

National Hunt races in Ireland
National Hunt hurdle races
Leopardstown Racecourse
Recurring sporting events established in 1950
1950 establishments in Ireland